Statistics of the V-League in the 1993-94 season.

First stage
16 participants divided into 2 groups playing single round robin;
top-4 of both to second stage.

Group A
An Giang
Hai Quan (Q)
Dong Thap (Q)
Long An (Q)
CLB Quan Doi (Q)
CA Hai Phong
CA Thanh Hoa

Group B
Cang Saigon (Q)
CA TP.HCM (Q)
Quang Nam-Danang (Q)
Song Lam Nghe An
Binh Dinh (Q)
Song Be
Tien Giang
Duong Sat VN

Second stage

8 participants divided into 2 groups playing single round robin; 
no draws; top-2 of both to semifinals

Group 1
 Long An (Q)
 CLB Quan Doi (Q)
 Binh Dinh
 Quang Nam-Danang

Group 2
 Cang Saigon (Q)
 CA Tp.HCM (Q)
 Hai Quan
 Dong Thap

Semifinals

 Long An 1-3 CA Tp.HCM
 Cang Saigon 1-0 CLB Quan Doi

Final

 Cang Saigon 2-0 CA Tp.HCM

References
1993–94 V-League at RSSSF

Vietnamese Super League seasons
Viet
1993 in Vietnamese football
1994 in Vietnamese football